Thomas Cook AG was an Anglo-German, global travel group. The group had its headquarters in Rochdale, and sold products such as package holidays and flights through its 3 in-house airlines. On 19 June 2007, the group merged with MyTravel Group plc to form the Thomas Cook Group plc, which was listed on the London Stock Exchange.

History

In 2001, Thomas Cook & Son was acquired by the German company C&N Touristic AG, which changed its name to Thomas Cook AG.

On 21 December 2005, Thomas Cook AG sold off Thomas Cook International Markets (a venture which includes 60% of the stake in Thomas Cook India Ltd) to Dubai Financial LLC, part of the Dubai Investment Group (DIG) which manages the financial and real estate interests of Sheikh Mohammed bin Rashid Al Maktoum, ruler of Dubai. Following this, Thomas Cook Overseas Limited (a wholly owned subsidiary of Thomas Cook UK) was sold off, this time again to Dubai Financial LLC.

Thomas Cook Canada was sold to Transat A.T. in 2006, marking Thomas Cook's exit from the North American market in terms of its own retailer.

On 12 February 2007, Thomas Cook AG announced that it had agreed terms on a merger with MyTravel Group to form Thomas Cook Group. The merger was completed on 19 June 2007.

Operations

References

Transport companies established in 2001
Transport companies disestablished in 2007
Defunct companies of Germany